Pamela Hayden (born November 28, 1953) is an American actress and voice actress, known for providing various voices for the animated television show The Simpsons, such as Milhouse Van Houten.

Biography
Hayden provides voices for characters in The Simpsons including Bart Simpson’s unlucky best friend Milhouse Van Houten, teenage thug Jimbo Jones, Ned Flanders' first-born son Rod, Chief Wiggum’s wife and Ralph Wiggum‘s mother Sarah, Lois Pennycandy and Lisa Simpson’s friend Janey Powell. She also originally voiced the character of Katrina (Shanks) Meltsner and Doris Rathbone, on the Focus on the Family radio drama Adventures in Odyssey from 1993 to 2000. She is also the voice actress for Bianca from Spyro: Year of the Dragon, Douglas McNoggin on Lloyd in Space and Sublimity Jill/Daughter #2 in Party Wagon.

Filmography

Films

Television

Music videos

Video games
The Simpsons Cartoon Studio (1996) – Milhouse Van Houten, Jimbo Jones
The Simpsons: Virtual Springfield (1997) – Milhouse Van Houten, Rod Flanders
Spyro: Year of the Dragon (2000) – Bianca, Handel and Greta, additional voices
The Simpsons: Road Rage (2001) – Milhouse Van Houten
Spyro: Enter the Dragonfly (2002) – Bianca, additional voices
The Simpsons: Hit & Run (2003) – Milhouse Van Houten, Jimbo Jones, Rod Flanders, additional voices
The Simpsons Game (2007) – Milhouse Van Houten, Jimbo Jones, Rod Flanders, additional voices
The Simpsons Tapped Out (2012) – Milhouse Van Houten, Jimbo Jones, Rod Flanders, additional voices

Theme park
The Simpsons Ride (2008) – Milhouse Van Houten

References

External links
 

1953 births
Living people
American voice actresses
People from Windham, Maine
21st-century American women